Wandsbeker Chaussee is a U-Bahn and S-Bahn hub of the rail network in the district of Eilbek in the German city of Hamburg. It is now served by Hamburg S-Bahn lines S1 and S11 and Hamburg U-Bahn line U1 and consists of two separate stations for the S-Bahn and U-Bahn. It is classified by Deutsche Bahn as a category 4 station.

History 

Today's S-Bahn station was established in 1906 as part of the extension of the link line to Ohlsdorf as a station for the Hamburg-Altonaer Stadt- und Vorortbahn (Hamburg-Altona City and Suburban railway, the predecessor of the S-Bahn). The name S-Bahn was not used not until 1934.

The U-Bahn station was taken into service in 1962 with the opening of the new U-Bahn line to Wandsbek. The intermediate level with counter areas has been rebuilt several times: the ticket offices were reduced or eliminated, the ticket machines have been replaced several times (initially with numerous single price vending machines and later with multiple ticket machines) and the locker facilities have been removed. The platform remained largely in its original condition until 2008. In 2009, the walls behind the tracks were completely redecorated. Since then, the tiles have borne an image in different shades of blue, similar to Wartenau station, which had earlier been given a pattern in shades of red.

Structure 
The station is located at Wandsbeker Chaussee, on the border between the districts of Hamburg Eilbek and Wandsbek. The S-Bahn tracks are in a cutting below the road and cross it at approximately right angles. The central platform of the S-Bahn starts just south of Wandsbeker Chaussee and extends below Pappelallee. The Hamburg freight rail bypass runs a few metres to the east and parallel with the tracks of the S-Bahn.

The U-Bahn station is located on two underground levels below the S-Bahn. Its central platform is located approximately between Seumestraße and Menckesallee under Wandsbeker Chaussee. At both ends, there are stairs that each lead to lobbies, which are accessible to the surface via multiple exits.

No direct path has been built between the S-Bahn and the U-Bahn stations. Connecting passengers must therefore walk a short distance on the surface.

S-Bahn and U-Bahn services 

The following services stop at the station:

Gallery

See also 

 List of Hamburg S-Bahn stations
 List of Hamburg U-Bahn stations

Notes

External links 

 
 Line and route network plans, hvv.de 

Hamburg S-Bahn stations
Hamburg U-Bahn stations in Hamburg
U1 (Hamburg U-Bahn) stations
Buildings and structures in Wandsbek
Railway stations in Germany opened in 1907